Brian Ford (born September 22, 1961) is a Canadian retired professional ice hockey goaltender who played eleven games in the National Hockey League with the Quebec Nordiques and Pittsburgh Penguins during the 1983–84 and 1984–85 seasons. The rest of his career, which lasted from 1982 to 1991, was spent in various minor leagues.

Career statistics

Regular season and playoffs

Awards and honours

References

External links

1961 births
Living people
Baltimore Skipjacks players
Billings Bighorns players
Canadian ice hockey goaltenders
Carolina Thunderbirds players
Fredericton Express players
Medicine Hat Tigers players
Moncton Hawks players
Pittsburgh Penguins players
Quebec Nordiques players
Rochester Americans players
Ice hockey people from Edmonton
St. Albert Saints players
Undrafted National Hockey League players